The Slovak Air Force (or SVZ), between 1939 and 1945, was the air force of the short-lived World War II Slovak Republic. Its mission was to provide air support at fronts, and to protect Bratislava and metropolitan areas against enemy air attack.

History
One of the SVZ's first air battles was in the Slovak–Hungarian War in March 1939 in which Hungary reoccupied Carpathian Ruthenia and parts of southern Slovakia. In this the SVZ suffered some losses against Royal Hungarian Air Force. The SVZ also took part in the German Invasion of Poland.

The SVZ took part in Axis offensives in the Ukraine and Russian Central front sectors of the Eastern Front under the lead of Luftwaffe in the Stalingrad and Caucasus operations. The engagement in the cost it great losses of aircraft and personnel.

For the rest of the war the SVZ fought US Army Air Forces and Royal Air Force raids against Slovakia.

The symbol of the Slovak air force was a blue and white cross similar to the German Balkenkreuz, with a red disc in the centre. It was carried on the tail and wings. Engine covers were painted yellow and there was a vertical line on the fuselage.

Training aircraft were supplied by Germany and Italy. To defend Slovak air space, the air force used Messerschmitt 109 (E and G types), Avia B-534, and some other interceptor types. It was also helped by Luftwaffe units active in the area.

When Romania and the Soviet Union entered Slovakia, with some captured aircraft and defectors they organized a local Insurgent Air Force to continue the fight against Axis forces in country. Others served voluntarily in Luftwaffe units; later these air units were integrated to the reconstituted Czechoslovak Air Force after the end of the war.

Notable SVZ air aces

Ján Režňák
Izidor Kovárik
Ján Gerthofer
František Cyprich
František Brezina
Anton Matúšek
Jozef Štauder
Pavol Zeleňák
Rudolf Božík
Vladimír Kriško
Alexander Gerič
Jozef Jančovič
František Hanovec
Rudolf Palatický
Štefan Martiš
Juraj Puškár
Štefan Ocvirk
Ondrej Ďumbala
Jozef Drlička
Martin Danihel
Ivan Kocka

Units of the Slovak Air Force
 1st unit of Stíhacia letka (fighter unit), Slovenské vzdušné zbrane, air unit to support the Slovak forces in Russia, Zhytomyr-Kiev, Ukraine, October 1941

Aircraft of the Slovak Air Force
Arado Ar 96B-5
Bücker Bü 131B Jungmann
Bücker Bü 133 Jungmeister
Bücker Bü 181D Bestmann
Fieseler Fi 156C-2
Focke-Wulf Fw 44C Stieglitz
Focke-Wulf Fw 58C Weihe
Focke-Wulf Fw 189A-1 Uhu
Gotha Go 145C
Heinkel He 72B-1 Kadett
Heinkel He 111H-3
Junkers W 34h
Junkers Ju 52/3m g7e
Junkers Ju 87D-3
Klemm Kl 35D
Messerschmitt Bf 109E-7
Messerschmitt Bf 109G-6
Siebel Fh 104 Hallore
Siebel Si 204A
Avia B-71 (single Avia B-71 aircraft until April 18, 1943, when čtk Anton Vanko and four other airmen defected with it to Turkey)
Avia B.122
Avia BH-33E
Avia B-534
Aero A.100
Aero Ab-101
Aero A.300
Aero A.304
Aero AP-32
Beneš-Mráz Be-50 Beta-Minor
Letov Š-231
Letov Š-328
Praga E-39
Praga A/B-32 Pardubitz
Praga E-51
Praga E-210
Praga E-240
Zlín Z-XV
Zlín Z-XII
Caudron C.445 Goeland
Avro 626
Savoia-Marchetti SM.84bis

These were primarily assigned to Letecky Pluk (Air Regiment) 3 and numbered 79 Avia B-534 and 11 Bk-534 biplane fighters, 73 Letov S-328 biplane observation, and 15 Aero A-100 and Ab-101 biplane reconnaissance aircraft plus a miscellany of trainers and other minor types. However, it also had three bombers, a Bloch MB-200, a Fokker F.VII and a Avia B-71, a license-built copy of the SB-2 light bomber.
Such a large number of Czech airmen departed for the German-occupied Protectorate of Bohemia-Moravia that the Slovaks were forced to reduce the numbers of squadrons to more sustainable levels. The original 5 fighter pletky (squadrons) were reduced to 3, numbers 11, 12, and 13 while the 7 original reconnaissance and observation pletky were consolidated into 3, numbered 1st, 2nd, and 3rd.

See also
 Czechoslovak Air Force
 Slovak Air Force

References

External links

Military history of Slovakia
Slovak Air Force
Military units and formations established in 1939
Military units and formations disestablished in 1945